Danakilia dinicolai is a species of cichlid endemic to the saline Lake Abaeded in Eritrea. The specific name honours Ernesto Di Nicola (1969-2001) who was a member of the expedition to Lake Abaeded who died in a car accident while returning from the lake.

References

Endemic fauna of Eritrea
Danakilia
Fish described in 2010